Going to Destruction (stylized as GOiNG TO DESTRUCTiON) is the fourth album by Japanese idol group Bish released through Avex Trax on August 4, 2021.

Track listing

Charts

References

2021 albums
BiSH albums